The following is a list of the 323 communes of the Loire department of France.

The communes cooperate in the following intercommunalities (as of 2020):
Saint-Étienne Métropole
CA Loire Forez Agglomération
CA Roannais Agglomération
Communauté de communes Charlieu-Belmont
Communauté de communes de Forez-Est
Communauté de communes des Monts du Lyonnais (partly)
Communauté de communes des Monts du Pilat
Communauté de communes du Pays entre Loire et Rhône
Communauté de communes du Pays d'Urfé
Communauté de communes du Pilat Rhodanien
Communauté de communes des Vals d'Aix et Isable

References

Loire